Victor Ciutacu (born May 15, 1970 in Sinaia, Prahova) is a Romanian fake news "journalist" and political commentator, the former chief editor of the daily newspaper Jurnalul Naţional and also the former host of the talk show Vorbe grele which was broadcast by Antena 3. He joined Romania TV in 2013, where his show, Punctul culminant, achieved great success.

References

External links
 Jurnalul Naţional editorials
 Personal blog

1970 births
Living people
People from Sinaia
Politehnica University of Bucharest alumni
Romanian newspaper editors
Romanian opinion journalists
Broadcast news analysts
Romanian Jews